'Sad Angel' is a song by Fleetwood Mac, written by guitarist and vocalist Lindsey Buckingham, from their EP Extended Play, released in 2013.

Background
"Sad Angel" and another Buckingham song, "Miss Fantasy", were intended to be released before their 2013 world tour. This did not happen, and it was instead included on Extended Play. Like many of his songs, Buckingham wrote "Sad Angel" for his former girlfriend Stevie Nicks. "All these years later, we are still writing songs that are dialogues for each other," he says. "That was part of the appeal of Rumours, and of the group in general... Of all the things we cut, "Sad Angel" was, for lack of a better term, the most Fleetwood Mac-y. It was really kind of the best stuff that we have done in a while."

"Sad Angel" was also performed on Fleetwood Mac's 2013 world tour, Fleetwood Mac Live.

Reception
Dave Lifton of Ultimate Classic Rock gave the song 7/10. While praising the rhythm section of Mick Fleetwood and John McVie, he felt that Stevie Nicks' vocals were lacking, with her trademark personality absent. "...For a band that has traded so frequently on the duo's history together, "Sad Angel" doesn't offer much in the way of tension between its two lead singers."

IGN gave the song a 9.8, complimenting both the instrumentation and harmonies, labeling it as the highlight of the EP, along with "Miss Fantasy". Buckingham's electric guitar playing was praised, giving the song "a good deal of momentum", and the instrumentation in general "upbeat and superb". Both singers' vocals were considered strong, providing the song with their trademark harmony. "Judging by this track, one could say that life has been good to Fleetwood Mac, specifically Buckingham and Nicks. A bright spot and possibly the highlight of their musicianship from the past 15 years or so…"

Personnel
Mick Fleetwood – drums, percussion
John McVie – bass guitar
Lindsey Buckingham – acoustic guitar, electric guitar, keyboards, lead vocals
Stevie Nicks – backing vocals

Charts

References

Fleetwood Mac songs
2013 songs
Songs written by Lindsey Buckingham